Dongaksan is a mountain of Jeollanam-do, western South Korea. It has an elevation of 745 metres.

See also
List of mountains of Korea

References

Mountains of South Jeolla Province
Gokseong County
Mountains of South Korea